"Someday" is a song performed by all-female German group No Angels. Written and composed by Swedish musicians Thomas Jansson and Niklas Hillbom, it was produced by  frequent collaborator Thorsten Brötzmann for the band's third studio album Pure (2003). A latin-flavored pop song, the midtempo ballad's instrumentation includes flamenco guitars, castanets and synthesizers. Lyrically, "Someday" speaks of a woman realizing that her relationship has come to an end, though she is hopeful that she and her love interest will be able to resume their romance in another time and place.

The song received a mixed reception from music critics and was released as a single on 13 July 2003, the second song to precede the release of Pure. A moderate success, it reached number 16 in Austria and number 26 in Switzerland, while it charted at number five on the German Singles Chart where it became No Angels' seventh non-consecutive top five single. Katja Kuhl directed a music video for "Someday" near the Le Luc Formula One racing track in Var in southeastern France which features a love story between  band member Vanessa Petruo and a male racing driver. The band premiered "Someday" during an acoustic concert in Munich club P1.

Background 
After Jessica Wahls' pregnancy break from the group and the end of the Four Seasons Tour, the remaining four members of No Angels began intensifying work on their then-untitled third studio album. Encouraged to exercise more self-control on the longplayer after their critically acclaimed contribution on predecessor Now... Us!, the band took over responsibility in composing, recording and selecting songs to guarantee a more personal theme on the album — a step that challenged criticism and growing scepticism among the band's label Cheyenne Records and recording company Polydor. "Someday" was written by Swedish musicians Thomas Jansson and Niklas Hillbom, while production was helmed by frequent collaborator, German producer Thorsten Brötzmann. Recorded at Department Studios in Frankfurt am Main, it was mixed by Jeo, while vocal recording was overseen by Klaus Üblacker. Keyboards were handled by Michael Knauer, Stefan Hansen, Jeo and Brötzmann, while guitars were played by Peter Weihe. One of the first songs recorded for Pure, No Angels first performed "Someday" at an acoustic concert in Munich club P1 in spring 2003.

Music video 

The music video for "Someday" was directed by German filmmaker Katja Kuhl and produced for Bigfish Filmproduktion. It was filmed on various locations near the Le Luc Formula One racing track in Var, a department of southeastern France, in the week of 9 June 2003. Camera was operated by Martin Ruhe throughout shooting, with Alexander Palm serving as his first assistant. Timo Fritsche was hired as editor, while Sabine Haarer was responsible for styling.

"Someday" was filmed over twenty hours and largely waives choreographies since band member Nadja Benaissa suffered from a cruciate ligament rupture during the shoot. Contentually, the video features a love story between Vanessa Petruo and a male racing driver. While Benaissa serves as both the story's fictional writer and Petruo's friend, Sandy Mölling and Lucy Diakovska are seen as a mechanic and a racing driver, respectively, who work for the same garage. "Someday" worldpremiered on MTV Central's daily live show MTV Select on 25 June 2003.

Track listings

Credits and personnel
Credits adapted from the liner notes of Pure.

 Production – Thorsten Brötzmann
 Keyboards – Michael Knauer, Stefan Hansen, Jeo, Brötzmann
 Guitar – Peter Weihe

 Mixing – Jeo
 Vocal recording – Klaus Üblacker
 Supervising producer – Nik Hafemann

Charts

Weekly charts

Covers 
 In 2002, French singer Ève Angeli covered the song in French, as "Sans Toi" (Without You), from her second album Nos différences.
 In 2003, entertainer Belinda covered the song in Spanish, as "Lo Puedo Lograr" (I Can Get It), from her debut album.

References

External links
 NoAngels-Music.de – official site

2003 singles
No Angels songs
Polydor Records singles
2003 songs